Beaver Township is one of ten townships in Newton County, Indiana, United States. As of the 2010 census, its population was 1,573 and it contained 726 housing units.

Geography

Cities, towns, villages
 Morocco

Cemeteries
The township contains four cemeteries: Beaver City, Murphy, Bell, and Oakland.

Major highways
  U.S. Route 41
  State Road 114

Lakes
 Cory Lake
 J C Murphy Lake

School districts
 North Newton School Corporation

Political districts
 Indiana's 1st congressional district
 State House District 15
 State Senate District 6

References
 
 United States Census Bureau 2008 TIGER/Line Shapefiles
 IndianaMap

External links
 Indiana Township Association
 United Township Association of Indiana
 City-Data.com page for Beaver Township

Townships in Newton County, Indiana
Townships in Indiana